Willie Ludick (6 May 1941 – 12 May 2003) was a South African boxer. He competed in the men's light welterweight event at the 1960 Summer Olympics. At the 1960 Summer Olympics, he defeated Martti Lehtevä of Finland, before losing to Vladimir Yengibaryan of the Soviet Union.

References

1941 births
2003 deaths
South African male boxers
Olympic boxers of South Africa
Boxers at the 1960 Summer Olympics
People from Vereeniging
Light-welterweight boxers
Sportspeople from Gauteng